Megalagrion molokaiense, common name Molokai damselfly, is a species of damselfly in the family Coenagrionidae. It is endemic to Hawaii.  Its natural habitat is subtropical or tropical moist montane forests. It is thought that it breeds on dripping wet embankments or in small streams in habitats that lack gambusia.

References

Coenagrionidae
Insects of Hawaii
Biota of Molokai
Endemic fauna of Hawaii
Odonata of Oceania
Critically endangered fauna of Hawaii
Insects described in 1899
Taxonomy articles created by Polbot